This is a list of honorary degree recipients from Binghamton University in New York.

External links
 Honorary Degree Recipients

Binghamton University
Binghamton University
United States education-related lists